Romaniote may refer to:
Romaniote Jews
Yevanic language, the language of the Romaniote Jews

Language and nationality disambiguation pages